Criotettix is an Asian genus of ground-hoppers (Orthoptera: Caelifera) in the tribe Criotettigini.

Species 
Criotettix includes the species:

Criotettix acutipennis Karsch, 1900
Criotettix afghanus Cejchan, 1969
Criotettix armigera Walker, 1871
Criotettix baiseensis Deng, Zheng & Wei, 2006
Criotettix bannaensis Zheng & Xie, 2000
Criotettix beihaiensis Wei, Zheng & Deng, 2006
Criotettix bispinosus Dalman, 1818 - type species (as Acrydium bispinosum Dalman)
Criotettix borrei Bolívar, 1887
Criotettix brachynotus Zheng & Jiang, 1994
Criotettix brevipennis Zheng & Xie, 2002
Criotettix cliva Wei, Zheng & Deng, 2006
Criotettix curticornis Hancock, 1915
Criotettix curvispinus Zheng, 1993
Criotettix damingshanensis Zheng & Jiang, 1998
Criotettix fastiditus Bolívar, 1917
Criotettix fuscus Hancock, 1907
Criotettix gariyabandicus Gupta & Chandra, 2018
Criotettix gidhavensis Gupta & Chandra, 2018
Criotettix guangdongensis Zheng, 2012
Criotettix guangxiensis Deng, Zheng & Wei, 2006
Criotettix hainanensis Liang, 2002
Criotettix handschini Günther, 1937
Criotettix indicus Bolívar, 1902
Criotettix inornatus Walker, 1871
Criotettix interrupta Zheng & Xie, 2002
Criotettix interruptaoides Deng & Zheng, 2015
Criotettix interrupticostus Zheng, 2006
Criotettix japonicus Haan, 1842
Criotettix latifemurus Deng, Zheng & Wei, 2006
Criotettix latiferus Walker, 1871
Criotettix latifrons Hebard, 1930
Criotettix longinota Wei, Zheng & Deng, 2007
Criotettix longipennis Liang, 2002
Criotettix longlingensis Zheng & Ou, 2003
Criotettix longzhouensis Zheng & Jiang, 2000
Criotettix miliarius Bolívar, 1887
Criotettix montanus Hancock, 1912
Criotettix napoensis Zheng, 2002
Criotettix nexuosus Bolívar, 1887
Criotettix nigrifemurus Zheng & Deng, 2004
Criotettix nigripennis Wei, Zheng & Deng, 2007
Criotettix nodulosus Stål, 1861
Criotettix okinawensis Ichikawa, 1994
Criotettix orientalis Hancock, 1913
Criotettix pallidus Hancock, 1915
Criotettix pallitarsis Walker, 1871
Criotettix robustus Hancock, 1907
Criotettix ruiliensis Zheng & Ou, 2009
Criotettix saginatus Bolívar, 1887
Criotettix shanglinensis Deng, Zheng & Wei, 2007
Criotettix strictvertex Zheng, Wei & Li, 2009
Criotettix strictvertexoides Zheng, Wei & Li, 2009
Criotettix subulatus Bolívar, 1887
Criotettix telifera Walker, 1871
Criotettix torulisinotus Zheng, Wei & Liu, 1999
Criotettix transpinius Zheng & Deng, 2004
Criotettix triangularis Zheng, 2008
Criotettix undatifemurus Deng, 2019
Criotettix vidali Bolívar, 1887
Criotettix yingjiangensis Zheng & Ou, 2011
Criotettix yunnanensis Zheng & Ou, 2003
Criotettix zhejiangensis Zhang, Li & Zhi, 2019

References

External links 
 

Tetrigidae
Caelifera genera
Orthoptera of Indo-China